Campylacantha is a genus of spur-throated grasshoppers in the family Acrididae. There are about five described species in Campylacantha.

Species
These five species belong to the genus Campylacantha:
 Campylacantha acutipennis (Scudder, 1875) i
 Campylacantha lamprotata Rehn and Hebard, 1909 i c g
 Campylacantha olivacea (Scudder, 1875) i c g b (fuzzy olive-green grasshopper)
 Campylacantha vegana Scudder and Cockerell, 1902 i c g
 Campylacantha vivax (Scudder, 1876) i
Data sources: i = ITIS, c = Catalogue of Life, g = GBIF, b = Bugguide.net

References

Further reading

External links

 

Melanoplinae
Articles created by Qbugbot